Linda Chambers may refer to:

Linda Chambers (playwright), screenwriter
Linda Chambers-Young, voice actress
birth name of Linda Sharrock (b. 1947), American jazz singer